Jazz Journal is a British jazz magazine established in 1946 by Sinclair Traill (1904–1981). It was first published in London under the title Pick Up, which Traill founded as a locus for serious jazz criticism in Britain.  In May 1948, Traill, using his own money, relaunched it as Jazz Journal. Traill, for the rest of his life, served as its editor-in-chief. Jazz Journal is Britain's longest published jazz magazine.

Ownership overview 
In April 1977, Billboard Limited – then the publisher of Music Week and The Artist – acquired publishing rights to Jazz Journal (via lease agreement) from the magazine's owner, Novello & Company, Ltd. Cardfront Publishers Limited, a division of Billboard Limited, became the publisher; Mike Hennessey became director; Traill continued as editor-in-chief; and the publication was renamed Jazz Journal International (JJI).

JJI was presumed to have ceased publication in January 2009, after the death on 23 January 2009 of the publisher's wife and associate editor, Janet Cook. Eddie Cook, who had been publisher and editor-in-chief of JJI since 1978, wrote to JJI readers that, following the death of his wife, publication of the magazine would cease, and that the magazine was seeking a new owner. In April 2009, JJI's holding company, which at the time was Jazz Journal Publishing, absorbed a rival magazine, Jazz Review. Jazz Review, originally a monthly, had been published every two months and was owned by Direct Music Limited of Edinburgh, Scotland, who wished to end their publishing interests. Jazz Journal was absorbed into JJI and first published as such in May 2009 under Mark Gilbert (born 1955) – the last editor of Jazz Review, stepping in as editor of the new Jazz Journal. Gilbert had served as deputy editor of JJI from 1981 to 1999.

The December 2018 issue was the last print edition of Jazz Journal before the magazine moved entirely online from 19 January 2019, at https://jazzjournal.co.uk. A publisher statement explaining the move said:

Timeline

Jazz Journal archives 
 In October 2009, Sarah Moy, daughter of Eddie Cook, donated materials from the JJI offices in Loughton to the National Jazz Archive, also situated in Loughton.

Notable contributors 
 Simon Adams
 Derek Ansell
 Ronald Atkins
 Bruce Crowther
 Roger Farbey
 Dave Gelly
 Fred Grand
 Andy Hamilton
 Gordon Jack
 Brian Morton
 Hugh Rainey
 Mike Tucker
 Steve Voce
 John White

References

External links 
 

Music magazines published in the United Kingdom
Jazz magazines
Magazines established in 1946
Monthly magazines published in the United Kingdom
Magazines published in London
1946 establishments in the United Kingdom